The French legislative elections took place on 16 March 1986 to elect the eighth National Assembly of the Fifth Republic. Contrary to other legislative elections of the Fifth Republic, the electoral system used was that of party-list proportional representation.

Since the 1981 election of François Mitterrand, the Presidential Majority was divided. In March 1983, Prime Minister Pierre Mauroy renounced the left's radical Common Programme which had been agreed in the 1970s. Wages and prices were frozen. This change of economic policy was justified by the will to stay in the European Monetary System. One year later, the Communist ministers refused to remain in Laurent Fabius' cabinet.

In opposition, the two main right-wing parties tried to forget their past quarrels. They were able to win the mid-term elections (1982 departmental elections, 1983 municipal elections, 1984 European Parliament election) and succeeded in forcing the government to abandon its policy of limiting the financing of private schools in 1984. The Rally for the Republic (RPR), led by Jacques Chirac, abandoned the traditional dirigiste and Eurosceptic Gaullist doctrines about the economy and European integration. It was then able to sign an electoral platform with the Union for French Democracy (UDF). It proposed notably to sell the companies nationalized by President Mitterrand and Pierre Mauroy.

However, France had also witnessed the electoral rise of the National Front (FN). Its leader, Jean-Marie Le Pen, made nationalist and xenophobic remarks. He appealed to part of the conservative electorate, notably some RPR voters. The right-wing opposition was divided on the question of an alliance with the FN. In 1985, President Mitterrand's decision to re-establish party-list proportional representation at the legislative election caused political outrage. The RPR/UDF opposition accused him of wanting to strengthen the FN in order to weaken the Republican Right, which was favourite to win according to the polls. Proportional representation was the only electoral system which was considered likely to allow the election of FN deputies.

While the polls indicated a win by the RPR/UDF coalition, the former UDF Prime minister Raymond Barre argued that the next parliamentary majority should refuse to govern if President Mitterrand did not resign. Advised by Edouard Balladur, Jacques Chirac noted, however, that impeachment did not exist in the French Constitution. Instead, the next majority would "cohabit" with Mitterrand. The right-wing cabinet would enforce its domestic policy programme and Mitterrand would keep control of foreign and military affairs.

Eventually, the RPR/UDF coalition obtained only a two-seat majority. Consequently, for the first time of the history of the Fifth Republic, the parliamentary majority was opposed to the President. Nevertheless, the Socialist Party held more seats than the polls had indicated. The FN was able to form a parliamentary group with its 35 elected members. The decline of the French Communist Party continued. Mitterrand nominated Chirac as Prime Minister. The first "cohabitation" of the Fifth Republic started. The new cabinet abolished proportional representation for the next legislative elections. The "cohabitation" ended with the 1988 legislative election.

Results 

|-
! style="background-color:#E9E9E9;text-align:left;vertical-align:top;" colspan=2 | Parties and coalitions
! style="background-color:#E9E9E9;text-align:right;" | Abbr.
! style="background-color:#E9E9E9;text-align:right;" | Votes
! style="background-color:#E9E9E9;text-align:right;" | %
! style="background-color:#E9E9E9;text-align:right;" | Seats
|-
|style="background-color:#4C4CB0"|
| style="text-align:left;" | Rally for the Republic/
Union for French Democracy Common lists
| style="text-align:right;" | RPR/
UDF
| style="text-align:right;" | 6,008,612
| style="text-align:right;" | 21.44
| style="text-align:right;" | 73  RPR
74 UDF
|-
|style="background-color:#0000C8"|
| style="text-align:left;" | Rally for the Republic (Rassemblement pour la République)
| style="text-align:right;" | RPR
| style="text-align:right;" | 3,143,224
| style="text-align:right;" | 11.22
| style="text-align:right;" | 76
|-
|style="background-color:#00CCCC"|
| style="text-align:left;" | Union for French Democracy (Union pour la démocratie française)
| style="text-align:right;" | UDF
| style="text-align:right;" | 2,330,167
| style="text-align:right;" | 8.31
| style="text-align:right;" | 53
|-
|style="background-color:#4C4CB0"|
| style="text-align:left;" | Miscellaneous Right-wing
| style="text-align:right;" | DVD
| style="text-align:right;" | 1,083,711
| style="text-align:right;" | 3.87
| style="text-align:right;" | 14
|- style="background-color:lightblue"
|style="text-align:left;" colspan=2|Total "RPR-UDF Union" (Right)
|
| style="text-align:right;" | 12,565,714
| style="text-align:right;" | 44.84
| style="text-align:right;" | 290
|-
|style="background-color:#E75480"|
| style="text-align:left;" | Socialist Party (Parti socialiste)
| style="text-align:right;" | PS
| style="text-align:right;" | 8,693,939
| style="text-align:right;" | 31.02
| style="text-align:right;" | 206
|-
|style="background-color:#FF0000"|
| style="text-align:left;" | French Communist Party (Parti communiste français)
| style="text-align:right;" | PCF
| style="text-align:right;" | 2,739,225
| style="text-align:right;" | 9.78
| style="text-align:right;" | 35
|-
|style="background-color:#DA7B8B"|
| style="text-align:left;" | Miscellaneous Left
| style="text-align:right;" | DVG
| style="text-align:right;" | 301,063
| style="text-align:right;" | 1.07
| style="text-align:right;" | 5
|-
|style="background-color:#FFBF00"|
| style="text-align:left;" | Movement of Left Radicals (Mouvement des radicaux de gauche)
| style="text-align:right;" | MRG
| style="text-align:right;" | 107,769
| style="text-align:right;" | 0.38
| style="text-align:right;" | 2
|-
|style="background-color:#FFD1DC"|
| style="text-align:left;" | UNG (Aimé Césaire, Martinique) 
| style="text-align:right;" | UNG
| style="text-align:right;" | 56,044
| style="text-align:right;" | 0.20
| style="text-align:right;" | 0
|- style="background-color:pink"
|style="text-align:left;" colspan=2| Total Left ("Presidential Majority" and PCF)
|
| style="text-align:right;" | 11,898,040
| style="text-align:right;" | 42.45
| style="text-align:right;" | 248
|-
|style="background-color:#0D378A"|
| style="text-align:left;" | National Front (Front national and Rassemblement national)
| style="text-align:right;" | FN
| style="text-align:right;" | 2,703,442
| style="text-align:right;" | 9.65
| style="text-align:right;" | 35
|-
|style="background-color:#960018"|
| style="text-align:left;" | Far-Left
| style="text-align:right;" | EXG
| style="text-align:right;" | 430,352
| style="text-align:right;" | 1.54
| style="text-align:right;" | -
|-
|style="background-color:#77ff77"|
| style="text-align:left;" | Ecologists
| style="text-align:right;" | ECO
| style="text-align:right;" | 340,109
| style="text-align:right;" | 1.21
| style="text-align:right;" | -
|-
|style="background-color:#80461B"|
| style="text-align:left;" | Far-Right
| style="text-align:right;" | EXD
| style="text-align:right;" | 57,432
| style="text-align:right;" | 0.20
| style="text-align:right;" | -
|-
|style="background-color:#dddd00"|
| style="text-align:left;" | Regionalists
| style="text-align:right;" | REG
| style="text-align:right;" | 28,379
| style="text-align:right;" | 0.10
| style="text-align:right;" | -
|-
|
| style="text-align:left;" | Total
|
| style="text-align:right;" | 28,024,168
| style="text-align:right;" | 100.00
| style="text-align:right;" | 573
|-
| style="text-align:left;" colspan=6 | Abstention: 22.00%
|}

8th Assembly by Parliamentary Group

1986 elections in France
1986